The Percival Vega Gull was a 1930s British, four-seater touring aircraft built by Percival Aircraft Limited.  It was a single-engine, low-wing (Folding), wood-and-fabric monoplane with a fixed tailwheel undercarriage.

Design and development
Built by Percival Aircraft of Gravesend and Luton (after 1936 when Percival Aircraft became a Limited Company), the 'K-Series' Vega Gull was a development of their earlier 'D-Series' Gull.  The main changes from the earlier design were the provision of a fourth seat, dual controls and flaps. The fuselage was widened and the wingspan increased. Increases in drag were compensated for by reducing parasitic drag from exterior fittings such as hinges and actuation horns. This work was largely attributable to the arrival at Percivals of the talented aircraft designer Arthur Bage. Thus, the Vega Gull was very nearly as fast as the more svelte Gull Six. Payload, range and utility were all much improved. The prototype G-AEAB first flew from Gravesend in November 1935.

The Vega Gull retained the de Havilland Gipsy Six air-cooled inline engine introduced in the D.3 Gull Six of 1934.  Most examples were fitted with the optional DH Gipsy Six Series II engine in conjunction with the DH-PD30 VP airscrew. The final Mk II examples were fitted with a curved windscreen (the earlier examples had a multi-faceted windscreen of flat panels) similar in appearance to the early marks of the Proctor.

Operational history
A Vega Gull named "Messenger" was used by Beryl Markham on her transatlantic flight 4–5 September 1936, the first non-stop solo crossing by a woman, and the first east-to-west solo crossing.

Two early production Vega Gulls were entered into the Schlesinger Race from England to Johannesburg, South Africa. C.W.A. Scott and Giles Guthrie flying Vega Gull G-AEKE was the only finisher landing at Rand Airport on 1 October 1936.  The aircraft had left Portsmouth 52 hours 56 minutes 48 seconds earlier. With the publicity of the win, Percival set up a production line at larger premises at Luton. The new type was an immediate success with production running to 90, the last production aircraft having its maiden flight on 27 July 1939.

The Vega Gull was widely used by British and Commonwealth aviators during the later years of the "Golden Age" of record-setting aviation during the 1930s. Alex Henshaw, Jim Mollison, Amy Johnson, Beryl Markham, C.W.A. Scott and others, won races and broke records to South Africa, South America, Australia and New Zealand, to name but a few.

In addition to civil orders, 15 were ordered by the Air Ministry.  Of these, 11 served with 24 Squadron Royal Air Force on communications duties and two were issued to the Fleet Air Arm, which was yet to come under Admiralty control.  The remaining two were used by the British air attachés in Buenos Aires and Lisbon. A third aircraft for use by the British air attaché in Berlin was seized by the Germans at the outbreak of the Second World War. It remains unclear whether the Luftwaffe subsequently used this machine.

After the outbreak of war, Vega Gulls were requisitioned for military use.  In the UK, 21 were impressed in 1939–40, 14 for the RAF and seven for the FAA.  Two aircraft were impressed in each of Australia and India, while one other was "called to the colours" in New Zealand.

By the end of the war, the Vega Gull had been largely supplanted by its younger sibling, the Proctor, of which more than 1,100 were manufactured. Most Proctors, especially the later examples, were slower and more cumbersome than the original Vega. Despite the obvious drawbacks of its wooden airframe in terms of durability, the Vega Gull compares favourably with more modern designs. To save hangar space, the wings could be folded to reduce the space needed for storage.

Variants
 Type K.1 Vega Gull: Single-engined, four-seat touring aeroplane.

Operators

Civil operators
Civil Vega Gulls have been registered in the following countries; Argentina, Australia, Belgium, Canada, France, Germany, India, Iraq, Japan, Kenya, Netherlands, New Zealand, Sweden, Switzerland, United Kingdom and United States.

Military operators

Argentine Air Force

Royal Australian Air Force
Governor-General's Flight RAAF

Belgian Air Force

Luftwaffe operated a number of captured aircraft.

Royal Iraqi Air Force

Kenya Auxiliary Air Unit

Royal New Zealand Air Force
No. 42 Squadron RNZAF

Royal Air Force
No. 24 Squadron RAF
Royal Navy

Specifications (Vega Gull, Gipsy Six Series II)

See also

Notes

Bibliography

 Ellison, Norman H. Percivals Aircraft (The Archive Photographs Series). Chalford, Stroud, UK: Chalford Publishing Company, 1997. .
 Gearing, David. W. On the Wings of a Gull – Percival and Hunting Aircraft. Stapleford, UK:Air-Britain (Historians), 2012, 
 Grey, C.G. Jane's All the World's Aircraft 1938. London: David & Charles, 1972. .
 Jackson, A.J. British Civil Aircraft 1919–1972, Volume III. London: Putnam, 1988. .
 Lewis, Peter. British Racing and Record-Breaking Aircraft. London: Putnam, 1970, .
 Percival, Robert. "A Portrait of Percival." Aeroplane Monthly, Vol. 12, No. 9, September 1984.
 Silvester, John. "Percival Aircraft 1933–1954 (Parts 1–4)." Aeroplane Monthly, Vol. 11, No. 1–4, January–April 1983.

External links

 "Plane Fits into Garage When Wings Are Folded" Popular Mechanics, April 1936

Vega Gull
1930s British civil utility aircraft
1930s British military utility aircraft
Single-engined tractor aircraft
Low-wing aircraft
Aircraft first flown in 1935